Dryophylax ramonriveroi, the Guianan coastal house snake,  is a species of snake in the family Colubridae. The species is found in Venezuela, Suriname, Guyana, and Brazil.

References

Dryophylax
Snakes of South America
Reptiles of Venezuela
Reptiles of Suriname
Reptiles of Guyana
Reptiles of Brazil
Reptiles described in 2005